Anna (Seward) Pruitt (1862–1948), was born in Tallmadge, Ohio, on May 16, 1862, the daughter of John Woodhouse and Urania (Ashley) Seward. She traveled west in the early 1880s to teach school in Ojai, California; her letters about the trip were later published in the California Historical Quarterly (1937–1938).   She was a Protestant Christian missionary in Northern China and belonged to the so-called "missionary generation" of Americans born between the years 1860 - 1885.

Early years and children
To honor the example of a beloved cousin who had died in mission work in China, Anna Seward decided to travel there as a Presbyterian missionary and settled in Huang Xian, Shandong province in North China, where she met Cicero Washington Pruitt. They married on February 16, 1888, and had five children: Ida (1888–1985), John (1890–1912), Ashley (1892–1898), Virginia (died in infancy, 1894), Robert (1897–1961), and Dudley McConnell "Mac" (1902–1967). The death of Ashley and Virginia inspired Southern Baptists to send money to start a hospital in Huang Xian. The famous missionary Lottie Moon apparently babysat the children on some occasions. Ida was one of the few Westerners that remained influential in Chinese Aid and Development throughout much of the century even after the communist take over. While stationed in Huangxian, the children attended school at the Chefoo School operated by the China Inland Mission. Anna Seward began a missionary school for boys, and by 1904 C.W. Pruitt had organized the Baptist Theological Seminary for Central China.

Writings and later years
Anna wrote two books about missionary life in China: The Day of Small Things (Foreign Mission Board, Southern Baptist Convention, 1929) and Up from Zero: In North China (Broadman Press, 1939). She also wrote two children's books set in China: The Chinese Boat Baby (Rice Press, 1938) and Whirligigs in China: Stories for Juniors (Broadman, 1948). After C.W. retired in 1936, they returned to the United States and settled in Atlanta where he became the dean of the Baptist Foreign Missions of North America. Anna spent the last years of her life traveling and lecturing on China and mission work. Anna Seward died on June 20, 1948.

Most of this article is taken from the Radcliffe Finding Aid. See link below.

See also
Ida Pruitt
C.W. Pruitt
Lottie Moon
Southern Baptists
19th-century Protestant missions in China
List of Protestant missionaries in China
Christianity in China

External links
World Catalog entry for Missionary mother and radical daughter: Anna and Ida Pruitt in China, 1887-1939 - Marjorie King's thesis on Anna Seward, her daughter Ida and their different approaches to life and living with the Chinese people.
World Catalog entry for The day of small things Click here to read the PDF.
World Catalog entry for Up from Zero
World Catalog entry for The Chinese boat baby
World Catalog entry for Whirligigs in China: stories for juniors
World Catalog entry for California in the eighties. As pictured in the letters of Anna Seward.
 - 2006 book on Ida Pruitt with possible insight into her mother's outlook on life and the different point of view that Ida her daughter took. by Marjorie King
The Pruitt family's virtual library
The finding aid for Ida Pruitt's papers located at Radcliffe College. The papers contain many items related to C.W.
History of the Lottie Moon Christmas Offering

1862 births
1948 deaths
American Presbyterian missionaries
Presbyterian missionaries in China
Missionary educators
Female Christian missionaries
People from Tallmadge, Ohio
People from Ojai, California
American expatriates in China